Bóly is a town in Baranya County, Hungary. Until the end of World War II, the Inhabitants was Danube Swabians, also called locally as Stifolder, because there Ancestors once came at the 17th century and 18th century from Fulda (district). Mostly of the former German Settlers was expelled to Allied-occupied Germany and Allied-occupied Austria in 1945–1948, about the Potsdam Agreement.
Only a few Germans of Hungary live there, the majority today are the descendants of Hungarians from the Czechoslovak–Hungarian population exchange. They got the houses of the former Danube Swabians Inhabitants.

Twin towns – sister cities
Bóly is twinned with:
  Semriach, Austria
  Heroldsberg, Germany
  Cernat, Romania 
  Neded, Slovakia

Sports
The local sports team is called Bólyi SE.

References

External links

  in Hungarian, English and German

Populated places in Baranya County
Hungarian German communities